Taptapani is famous for its hot sulfur water spring, present in Sanakhemundi Block of Ganjam district. But, nearest town is Mohana, which about 18 km away in Gajapati district.

Etymology
The name “Taptapani” also suggests that. “Tapta” means hot and “pani” means water.

Hot spring
The hot water from the natural spring of Taptapani are attributed with medicinal properties and can be bathed in at the pond created next to the hot spring. The hot spring is situated at the eastern slope of the eastern ghat at a crest of the hill with in the lush green forest having wide range of flora and fauna.

Tourist attraction
The other attractions of Taptapani are its tribal communities and the picturesque landscape. There is also a deer park maintained by the forest department.

Transport
Taptapani enjoys comfortable transport facility from major cities of Odisha i.e. Bhubaneswar, Cuttack, Berhampur, Rayagada, Jeypore & Malkangiri. The nearest railway station is Berhampur Railway Station, lies on Howrah - Chennai main line

Accommodation
The sprawling Panthanivas is the only shelter for tourists at Taptapani. The two AC suites have a common balcony and each has a huge bedroom, a dressing room and a bathroom containing a small swimming pool fed by the warm water from the hot springs.

The cottages overlook a pristine valley replete with various shades of green. Anyone can leisurely spend hours sitting here. The Dining Hall is strategically placed in between two crests of mountain fold. A few minutes walk from here will take to Kandimata Mandir where the locals take a bath in the spring before offering their daily prayers. There is also a deer park maintained by the local forest department.

Hot springs of Odisha
Tourism in Odisha
Ganjam district